Avishek Mitra (born 12 July 1992) is a Bangladeshi cricketer who plays for Rajshahi Division. He made his Twenty20 debut for Mohammedan Sporting Club in the 2018–19 Dhaka Premier Division Twenty20 Cricket League on 26 February 2019.

See also
 List of Rajshahi Division cricketers

References

External links
 

1992 births
Living people
Bangladeshi cricketers
Mohammedan Sporting Club cricketers
Rajshahi Division cricketers
People from Rajshahi District